Grand Paris Seine Ouest 92 Issy (commonly known as GPSO 92 Issy or simply Issy) are a French women's football team based in Issy-les-Moulineaux. The club currently compete in Division 2 Féminine, the Second Division of women's football in France. The team was founded in 1997 as EuroPeru, and was known as FF Issy from 2001 until 2020.

History

GPSO 92 Issy were founded in 1997 by three Peruvian sisters, Edith, Merylin and Mercedes Bohorquez, under the name EuroPeru. The team initially consisted of 20 players from the local Peruvian community, and they played at the Stade Jean-Bouin in Issy-les-Moulineaux. The team began playing in the French league system in November 1999. In 2001, the club was renamed Foot Féminin d'Issy (FF Issy), after being taken over by Corinne Mesas. In 2012, former FF Issy manager Christine Aubère took over the club. GPSO 92 Issy is one of the only French clubs to be run exclusively for women, rather than being affiliated with a men's team. In the 2020–21 season, GPSO 92 Issy and Soyaux were the only exclusively female top division teams, and GPSO 92 Issy has over 250 members. 

In 2001, FF Issy played in Promotion de Ligue, the lowest division of the French regional football league. FF Issy achieved three successive promotions to reach the top division (Honorary Division) of the regional  for the 2003–2004 season. FF Issy were promoted to Division 1 Féminine for the 2012–13 season. They also played in the 2014–15 Division 1 Féminine. In 2018, there were suggestions of the club merging with men's Championnat National team Red Star, though the plans were later abandoned.

In April 2020, the French Football Federation (FFF) confirmed that Issy would be promoted to Division 1 Féminine for the 2020–21 season. In 2020, the team was renamed from FF Issy to Grand Paris Seine Ouest 92 Issy (GPSO 92 Issy). The new name reflects the fact the team is based in Hauts-de-Seine, which is French department number 92. Issy were initially relegated from Division 1 Féminine the next season. In July 2021, the FFF reprieved Issy, meaning that they would compete in the 2021–22 Division 1 Féminine. The decision was due to the knock-on effect of the COVID-19 pandemic on the French league systems. They finished 11th in the league, and were relegated to Division 2 Féminine for the 2022–2023 season.

First-team squad

Reserve and youth teams
GPSO 92 Issy Reserves play in the Regional 1 division of the Paris-Île-de-France League. The GPSO 92 Issy under-19s team play in the Challenge National.

References

Issy 
Association football clubs established in 1997
1997 establishments in France
Division 1 Féminine clubs

Issy
Issy